Piz Arblatsch is a mountain of the Oberhalbstein Alps, overlooking Mulegns in the canton of Graubünden.

References

External links
 Piz Arblatsch on Hikr

Mountains of the Alps
Alpine three-thousanders
Mountains of Switzerland
Mountains of Graubünden
Surses